Examples of sigla in use in the Middle Ages:

A 

ā—annus or aut.
á—aut.
Ắ—Antiphona.
a'—antiphona or autem.
a.—annus.
A.—Accursius or Albericus.
A:—Amen.
ab.—Abbas.
abbāssa—Abbatissa.
abd.—Abdiæ.
ābl'a—ambula.
abl'o—ablatio.
ābl'o—ambulatio.
abl'om—ablationem.
abłtm—ablativum.
abłto—ablativo.
abñia—absentia.
absol'em—absolutionem.
abst°—abstractio.
absʒ—absque.
A·B·T·—Annua...Bima...Trima.
ābul'oʒ—ambulationem.
a.C.—anno Christi or ante Christum.
acciˢ—accidens.
acci~—accipitur.
accⁿal'r—accidentaliter.
Accu—(De) Accusationibus.
Accur.—Accursius.
a'cls—æcclesia or ecclesia.
a.C.n.—ante Christum natum.
ac°—actio.
act'.—Actus (Apostolorum).
actā—activa.
actˡ'ʳ—actualiter.
A.D.—Anno Domini.
ađ—aliud.
addʒ—adderet.
adħ—adhuc.
A.D.I. or A.D.J.—Anno Dominicæ Incarnationis.
AD·N·—adiutor numerorum.
adń—ad nomen.
adnˡ'ʒ—adnihilet.
ad°—(ex) adverso or aliquod.
adq—adque, atque.
a·d·r·—anno dominicæ resurrectionis.
adˢ—adversus.
adʒ—adest.
ad=t—adesset.
A·E·C·E·U—At ego contra eam vindico.
AF—affectus.
AF·—ad finem.
A·F·—ante factum or actum fide.
A·F·F·—Annum faustum felicem.
aff°—affirmatio.
agð—agendum.
agẽ—agere.
agg.—Aggei (Prophetia).
āgl'—angelis.
āgl's—angelus.
AG·MAG·D—Agens Magistratum dixit.
AḠN·—Agnus.
agʳ—agitur.
āḡsti—Augusti.
AG·V—Agens vices.
aīał—animalis.
aīe—animæ.
a'is—aliis.
al.—Albertus, Albericus, alibi.
al' or aˡ—animal.
ała—alia.
Alb.—Albericus or Albertus (Papiensis).
ald'—aliud.
Ald.—Aldricus.
al'e—animale.
al'ia—animalia.
all or allā—alleluia.
All—Allegata.
ałł—alliis (aliis).
Ałł.—Allegoria.
ałn—aliquando.
Al.pa.—Albertus papiensis.
alŕ—aliter.
ałs—alias or aliis.
alủiˢ—alumnis.
Aλ—Talentum.
A.M.—Ave Maria.
āmīcl'o—amminiculo.
amí9—amicum.
āmoʳ—amovetur.
AÑ—anni.
aⁿ—ante.
anatħa—anathema.
A.N.D.—Anno Nativitatis Domini.
anđ—Andegavensis.
anđca—antedicta.
Ang.—Angelus (de Perusio).
angł or anˡ'—angelis.
annłis—annualis.
annłr—annualiter.
ANN·P—Annonæ Præfectus.
an.o.—ante omnia.
Ant.de.But.—Antonius de Butrio.
anułł—a nulla (ora).
Ańʒ—Anzianis.
ãor—maior.
a°s—alios.
a°t—aliquot.
Ap.—(De) appellationibus.
apd'—apud.
apłi—Apostoli.
apłs—apostolus.
A·P·M·—annorum plus minus.
ap. ob. re.—appellationis obstaculo remoto.
Aposta.—(De) Apostatis.
apostłs—apostolus.
appeˡ'—appetibilis.
appell.rē.—appellatione remota.
appłłois—appellationis.
A·P·PO—apud præfectum prætorio.
appōm—appositionem.
appʳ—appellatur or appretiator.
aprł—aprilis.
aps—apostolus.
A·P·T·—ad potestatem tuam.
AQI·S·—Aquilana Stipulatio.
Ar.—Ardizione (Jacopo di) or argumentum.
aʳ—aliter or maior.
a'r—a meridie.
Arbí.—(De) Arbitris.
Arch.—Archidiaconus.
archð—archidiaconus.
arcħi—archiepiscopi
Arch·M·—Archiepiscopatus Mediolani.
arcħo or arcħopo—archiepiscopo.
Arg.—Argumentum.
āres—maiores.
arłos—articulos.
ar°—arbitrio, argumento, arguo, articulo.
arʳ—argumentatur.
arta°—arctatio.
artiˡ'—articulis.
artˣ—artifex.
aˢ—alias or antecedens.
A·S·L·F·—a sua lege fecit.
assig°—assignatio.
assiłatur—assimilatur.
assʒʳ—assentitur.
At.C.—Ante Christum.
atⁿ or attⁿ—attamen.
atq· or atʒ or at7—atque.
Au.—Aurum.
AU·—Augustus.
aú—autem.
aủ—aut.
a·u·c·—anno Urbis conditæ.
auð—audiat or audituris.
au. de ca.—auri de camera (ducali).
auðʳ—auditur.
auētʳe—aventuræ.
aūg—augusti or augusto.
Auḡni—Augustini.
au°ʳ—auctor.
A·U·PɔS·—agens vicem Proconsulis.
authâs—authoritas.
authen.—authentica or authenticorum.
avūclī—avunculi.
awncłs—avunculus.

B 
B—8.
b.—...bus.
B.—Beatus, Bernhardus, Bulgarus.
b: or B:—...bus.
b;—...bus or ...bet.
·b'·—Bernhardus.
bʒ—...bus or ...bet.
b7—...bus.
babł—Babylonis.
Bal. or Bald.—Baldus.
bałł.—balliviæ or ballivis.
Band.—Bandinus.
bar.—Baruch.
Bartħs—Bartholomœus.
B·C·—bonorum curator.
BCA·—bona caduca.
BĒO—Bonorum emptio.
b.f.—bona fides.
B·F·C·—Bonæ fidei contractus.
BFD—Beneficium dedit.
BFO—beneficio.
B·G·—Bona gratia.
B·H·—Bona Hereditaria.
bib'r—bibitur.
bīfiʳ—beatificari.
błas—bladas or blavis.
błłi—belli.
bll'm—bellum.
bḿ—bonæ memoriæ.
B·M·—Boni Mores or Bona Materna.
B.M.—Beata Maria, Beata Mater, Benemeritus.
B·MN—Bona Munera.
bnđ.—benedicti.
bõ—bona.
BŌF—Bona Fortuna or Bonum Factum.
bo.me.—bonæ memoriæ.
Borcħ—Borchardus.
borð—bordarius.
bōs—beatos or bonos.
BP—Bonorum Possessio.
B.P.—Beatissime Patre, Beatus Paulus, Beatus Petrus.
BR—Bonorum.
BR.—breve.
bʳ—breviter.
bŕaui—breviavi.
bs—...bus.
b's—beatus.
B·U·—Bona vacantia.
Bul. or Bulg.—Bulgarus.
But.—Butrius.
B.V.—Beata Virgo, Beatitudinis Vestræ, bene vale, bene valeatis.
bz—...bet.

C 
C—Antisigma.
C.—Caput, Celestinus, centum, Codex, Comes, Congius.
c.—canonis, capitulus, centesimo, civis, confessor, conversus.
ĉ.—confessor or conversus.
Ca.—caput.
cal'—caloris.
cała—calida or cartula.
cal'aʒ—calidam.
cal'e—calidæ.
całē—caliditatem.
Call.—Calligarius.
całs—calidus.
canłí—canoniali.
cānʳ—causantur.
cant.—canticum.
ca°—capitulo.
capð—capud (caput).
capełł—capellanis.
capel.mo.—(De) capellis monachorum.
capełs—capellanus.
CAPL—Capitula.
capłło—capellano.
capl'm—capitulum.
capˢ—capitulus.
caŕ—caruca.
Card.—Cardinalis.
cardił—cardinalis.
cãre—curare.
carîa—carmina.
carl.—carlenus.
carł—cartula.
cãsal'—causalis.
cast°—castro.
c'at—creat.
cāu—casu.
cauˡ'—causalis.
caůnno—Cavronno.
Caz. or Caza.—Cazavillanus.
C·C·—calumniæ causa.
CC.—Carissimus (also plur. Carissimi), Clarissimus, Circum.
čč—contra.
c'ca—circa.
C·C·E·—causa conventa est.
ɔcʳrit—concurrit.
ɔceʳ—conceditur.
ɔcło—conclusio.
CC.PP.—Clarissimi Pueri.
ɔd'e—concedere.
ɔdêpnʒ—condempnet.
ɔd°—conditio.
ɔē—commune.
ceł—celebravit.
Censi.—(De) Censibus.
cetʳo—cetero.
ɔfcoʒ—confectionem.
ɔfō—confessio.
ɔfˢ—confessoris.
CH·—Christus.
cħ.—chorus.
cħar—chartam.
cħr—Charintiæ.
C.I.—Codex Iustiniani.
Cí.—Civem or Civis.
CIII—8 or VIII.
Cip.—Ciprianus.
circło—circulo.
cir9l'o—circumlocutio.
cỉs—cæteris.
cister.—cisterciensis.
cit.—citatio.
ciúe—civitate.
ɔiug—coniugis.
ciuil'r—civiliter.
ćiux—coniux.
cl.—clarissimus or clericus.
Cla.—Clarasci (Cherasco).
cła—Clavenna.
clasła—clausula.
cłci—clerici.
cłcs—clericus.
Cle.—Clementinæ or Clementinis.
Cle. pe.—(De) Clericis peregrinis.
Cle.pug.īdu.—(De) Clericis pugnantibus in duello.
Cler.vena.—(De) Clerico venatore.
CL·F·—Classis forensis.
cłicis—clericis.
çlḿ—cœlum.
cłr—clericus.
cl.u·—Clarissimus vir.
cl·uu·—clarissimorum virorum.
CL.V—Clarissimus vir.
₵M·—Causa mortis or Civitatis Mediolani.
C·M·F·—Clarissimæ memoriæ fœmina.
C.mo—centesimo.
ɔm°—commodo.
C·N·EE·C·C·—credimus non esse causa conventa.
cnł—concilio.
cnło—concilio.
ɔ°—communicatio or conclusio.
Co. or Colun—Columbus.
Cod. Theod.—Codex Theodosianus.
cōfoēs—confessiones.
Cog.le.—(De) cognatione legali.
cogn—cognomina.
Cog. spi.—(De) cognatione spirituali.
coḡtis—consanguinitatis.
cohāo—cohabitatio.
₵oħas—Coherentias.
coħiis—coherenciis.
coħt—cohæret.
cõiˢ—communis.
col'—coloris.
Col.—Colossenses (epistola ad).
coła—colera or copula.
coll'ʳ—colligitur.
Collu.dete.—(De) collusione detegenda.
cołłʒ—collationem.
col'ʳ—colitur.
Com.—Comitatus or Comitibus.
Commo.—(De) Commodato.
comʳ—communiter.
con.—concordat, confessor, consecratione.
conđni—conditioni.
conf.—confinans.
Confes.—(De) Confessis.
Confir.uti.—(De) Confirmatione utili.
Confʃ—confessoris.
₵ons.—Consecratione or Consularis.
₵onst.—Constantinopolis.
consunt~—conservantur.
Con.t.t.r.—consultationis tue taliter respondemus.
co°ʳ—commentator.
₵or.—Corinthios.
corði—corrigendi.
corl—corneliensis.
corr°e—corruptione.
c'ot'—cerotum.
C·P·—Clarissime Puer.
ɔpaⁿˢ—compatiens.
ćpł—complevi.
ɔpl'atʳ—copulatur.
cporís—corporis.
ɔqʳ—conqueritur.
CQSF·—Cumque suscepta fuisset.
cʳ or c~—cur.
cʳandi—curandi.
cʳant—curant.
cʳo—curo.
ćs—cui supra.
c'sc'—crescit.
c'sc'e—crescere.
C·S·Fl—cum suis filiis.
ɔstitd'—constituendum.
c.t.—celsitudo tua or certum tempus.
Cu.—Cuprum.
cū—cum.
ćũsi—conversi.
C.V.—Celsitudinis Vestræ.
Cy—Cynus or Cyprianus.
Cyp—Cyprianus.
Cẏst—Cysterciensis.
c'ʒ—cuique.
ć9—circum.
c9lʒ—cuiuslibet.

D 
d—2.
d.—distinctio.
D.—Deus, Dixit, Dominicus, Dominus, Dux. (plural: DD)
d'—dominicæ.
đ'—dominus.
đ.—denarii, dies, dimida, dimidium.
ð—de.
dab'—dabis.
dam;—damus.
Dama.—Damasus.
dāp°i—dampnationi.
dap.7.dīs.—dampni et dispendii.
d'bʒ—debet.
db7—debet.
đca—dicta.
ðcf—de confinio.
d'co—dicto.
D·C·S·—de consiliis sententia.
dd or d'd'—dicendum.
dđ—danda or dedit.
đđ—David, dedi, dedit.
đđa—dicenda or docenda.
D·D·E·—dare damnas esto.
d'dē—dedere.
dði—dictandi.
đði—dicendi.
ddīs—dicendis.
dđit· or đđrít—dederit.
dd'o—dicendo.
d'd'rūt—dederunt.
debʒ—debet.
decl'ioe—declinatione.
decl'om—declarationem.
dee—deest.
defđ—defendit.
delic.pu.—(De) delictis puerorum.
dep.—depuratus.
dep°—deputatio.
depōi—depositioni.
depʒ—dependet.
DEQ·AG·H·D—de quo agitur hodierna die.
dēt—debet.
ðet—daret.
deuol.—devolutum.
DFP—dare facere præstare.
DFQ·—domi forisque.
dī—Dei.
diacõ—diaconus.
dĩd' or ðīð—deinde.
dīða—dividenda.
dīdat—dividat.
d'idi—dividi.
dīd°—dimidio.
dīdʳ—dividitur.
d'ie—divinæ.
ðie—dictæ.
diffō—diffinitio (definitio).
DIḠ·M·—dignus memoriæ.
d'iˡ'—divisibilis.
dił—dilectis.
Díla.—(De) Dilationibus.
diłci—dilecti.
diłcois—dilectionis.
diłc9—dilectus.
diło—dilectio.
dil'oi—dilationi.
ðim—dimidiam or dimidium.
dimið—dimidium.
dīs—dispendii, dispendio, divisim.
discpłs—discipulus.
dispłi—discipuli.
dist°—distincto.
distʳ—distinguitur.
dis.ue.—discretioni vestræ.
dĩtʳ—duriter.
diuiˡ'—divisibilis.
diũo—divorcio.
dixt—dixit.
D·JHS·—Dominus Jesus.
D·L·—do lego.
đł—dilectissimi.
dl'ce—dulce.
DLM—dolus malus.
DM·—demum.
d'm°—dummodo.
D·M·V·—Devotæ Memoriæ Vir.
D.N.—Dominus noster.
dń—domino nostro.
dña—domina.
dñd'—dicendum.
D·N·E·—dubium non est.
dñi—domini.
đnicę—dominicæ.
dńm—dominum.
DNN—Domini.
dńo—Domino.
DNP—dubitari non potest.
D.N.PP.—Dominus noster Papa.
DNQ—Dominusque.
DÑS—Dominus.
dñti—dicenti.
D·O·—Deo Optimo or Deus Omnipotens.
dõ—Deo.
d'o—domini.
docʒ—docet.
D.O.M.—Deo Optimo Maximo.
dóm—domini.
doḿs—dominus.
DŌN—Dominum.
d°nes—dictiones.
đonū—dominum.
do°—dominio.
d°o—domino.
dot.—dotatione.
DP·—de periculo.
D·P·—de pecunia or dimidia pars.
D·P·F·—denuntiandi potestatem fecit.
d.pp.—denariorum papiensium.
dŕ or dʳ—dicitur.
ḑŕ—dicitur.
DRP—de re publica.
dś—Deus.
D·S·A·—diversæ scholæ auctores.
DT—dotis tempore.
ðt—debet.
dubō—dubitatio.
dubʳ—dubitatur.
duc°—ducentesimo.
duc.pp.—ducatus papiensis.
du°—dubio.
dū°—dummodo.
d'ut'.—deuteronomii (liber).
D.V.—Deus vult (God willing)
dvucto—ducentesimo.
dˣ—duplex.
dxt—dixit.

E 
·e·—ecclesiæ or est.
E—oboli quinque.
Ē or ē—enim or est.
easd'—easdem.
e'at—erat.
ebd'—ebdomadæ.
ęccła—aecclesia.
eccłiis—ecclesiis.
eɔ°—e contrario.
eđđ'—edendum.
EDĒ—eiusdem.
ẽẽt—esset.
EG·—egerunt or ergo.
egðr—egreditur.
eg°—ægro.
eg°tus—ægrotus.
egłij—evangelii.
egłm—evangelium.
eg'onẻ—egestionem.
eg°ni—ægrotationi.
eiʒ—enim.
Eĵ—ergo.
eł'ari—elementari.
el'ea—eleemosyna.
el'i—elementi.
el'ium—elixirium.
ell'us—elleborus.
el'm—elementum.
el'osinā—eleemosynam.
el'tis—elementis.
el'ʒ—elementum.
empl'o—emplastro.
eoð—eodem.
epal'—episcopalis.
epħ.—Ephesios (Epistula Pauli ad).
ēpi°—empyreo.
epis—episcopus.
ep'is—epatis.
episc—episcopum.
ẻpl'm—emplastrum.
epsco—episcopo.
E·R·A·—ea res agitur.
erpf—Erpfordia (Erffordia).
ET·NC—etiam nunc.
ẽto—æquato.
EUG—Evangelii.
ęugłia—ævangelia.
eugłtę—evangelistæ.
euict.—evictio or evictionis.
euiⁿˢ—evidens.
ewła—ewangelista.
ewn°—ewangelio.
EX·C·—ex consuetudine.
excantʳ—excusantur.
expll'r—expellitur.
expl'oi—expulsioni.
exūt—exeunte.
ezecħ—Ezechielis.
e&—esset.
e9°—e contrario.

F 
F—Fundus or oboliquatuor.
F.—Filius or frater (plural: FF.)
·F·—Fridericus.
facʳ or faʳ—faciliter.
fall'e or fll'e—fallaciæ.
F·C·—fiduciæ causa.
F·C·L·—fraudationis causa latitat.
FD—fideiussor.
F·E·—filius eius.
feł.—feliciter.
ff—fines.
fí or fi'—fieri.
fiāʳ—finaliter.
fideʳ—fideliter.
figʳe—figuræ.
fiˡ'—finalis.
fin'i—finiri.
fi°—filio.
FION·—fideiussionem.
fł—feliciter.
fl'a—falsa or flegma.
fl'ais—flaminis.
fl'e—felle.
fl'icis—flegmaticis.
fll'a—fallacia.
fllis—flagellis.
fllor—flagellorum.
fl's—falsum or famulus.
flủs—falsus.
fl'ʒ—falsum.
F·M·—fati munus or fieri mandavit.
FM·—forma.
f'm'to—fermento.
FO·—forte or fortes.
fr—frater.
fr.—fragmentum.
FR᾿—Francorum.
FRA—Francorum.
f'râ—frigidam.
frēm—fratrem.
frī—fratri, frumenti, futuri.
f'ria—feria.
frīdaʒ—frigidam.
frīm—frigidum.
frūel'—fratruelis.
FS·E· or F·S·E·—factus est or factum sic est.
FŪT—fuerit.
f·9—fuit confessus.

G 
G—6 or VI.
G.—Guarnerius.
Ḡ—gratia or gaudium.
g' or g~—igitur.
Gałłte—Gallarate.
gãst—gastaldus.
G·B·—Gens bona.
gcc—quia.
G·D·—gens dolosa.
GD·—gaudium.
G.deCa.—Guillelmus de Cabriano.
geň—genuit.
ge9—genus.
G·F·—germanus frater.
G'ħ—Gerhardus.
GI—7 or VII.
GL—gloria or gloriosissimi.
gła—gloria.
głam—gloriam.
GLD·—gloria decus.
GL·F·—Gloriosa fœmina.
gl'ifi°—glorificatio.
głose—gloriosæ.
G·M·—gens mala.
GN·—genus.
gn'is—generis.
gñosa—generosa.
gñtil'—gentilis.
gn'ʒ—generet.
g°.—ergo.
g°ssos—grossos.
GRV—Gravitas vestra.
G·S—Gloriosa sedes.
ḡts—gentes.
Guar.—Guarnerius.
guiðr—guiderdonum.
ḡuiʳ—graviter.
GUU—Gravitas vestra.
GV—Gravitas vestra.
Gz.—Guizardinus.

H 
h—autem.
H—Hugolinus.
h'—huius.
H'—Henricus.
h,—hoc.
h.—nihil.
ħ—hac, hec, hæc, hoc.
ḣ—hæc or hoc.
Ħ—hora.
hab'e—habere.
hab'&—haberet.
haīts—habitationis.
ħ'ant—habeant.
hāt—habeat.
H·B·—hora bona or heres bonorum.
h'bipoł—Herbipolensis.
h῾c—huc.
H.D.—hac die or hodierna die.
h·d·—his diebus or hereditas divisa.
ħđ—hac die, heredem, heredibus.
hđs—heredibus.
ħeđs—heredes.
hēs—habemus.
h'es—habens.
h·f·—honesta fœmina, honorabilis fœmina, hic fundavit.
ħħbus—heredibus.
hh.ff.—honestis fœminis.
h·i·—hereditario iure or heres institutus.
h'i—huius.
hīc—hinc.
h'il'—habilis.
hīnú—himnum.
ħirł or hirłm—Hierusalem.
h'ita—habita.
hł—hludovicus, ludovicus.
H·L·A·C·—Hac lege ad Consulem.
H·L·N·—honesto loco natus.
H·L·N·R·—Hac lege nihil rogatur.
hluđ—hludovicus, ludovicus.
ħmił—humilis.
H·M·U·—honestæ memoriæ vir.
ħndat—habundat.
hn's—habens.
hñtʳ—habentur.
hō—homo.
hö—hora.
hōmij—homagii.
h°ⁿ—hoc nomen.
H·P·—hereditatis possessio, honesta persona, honestus puer, hora pessima.
Hr.—Henricus.
HRC·—honestæ recordationis.
ħrd's—heredes.
ħs—habes.
h's—heres.
h't—habet.
H·U·—his verbis or honesta vita.
hu'í—humidi.
humłr—humiliter.
ħūnt—habebunt.
hús—heredibus.
hỷno—hymno.
h9i—huiusmodi.

I 
·i· or í.—id est.
ī—insititutus.
i'—in.
I'—item.
ia.—Iacobi (Epistula).
ián—Ianuarii.
I·B·—in brevi.
I.C. or I.X.—Jesus Christus.
i·c·—iuris consultus or intra circulum.
īca.ie.—in capite ieiunii.
I·C·E·—iure cautum est.
I·C·E·U·—iusta causa esse videtur.
īcl'om—inclinationem.
id'—idem.
id.—idem, idibus, idus.
îd'—inde.
iđ—idem, idest, idus.
īđe—indictione.
id'e—idem.
īd'id°—individuo.
īd'iˡ'—indivisibilis.
I.D.N.—In Dei nomine.
idñe—iurisdictione.
I·D·P·—iuri dicundo præest.
IE—Iudex esto.
IE'—Ierusalem.
IĒR—Jeronymus.
íf—inlustris fœmina.
ĩfcōm—infectionem.
īfiˡ'—infidelis.
īfl'o—inflammatio.
i·f°·—in foro.
I·F·CS·A·—in foro Cæsaris Augusti.
îf'mi—infirmi.
IG—ius gentium.
ig°rat—ignorat.
īh'e'—inhærere.
iherłm—iherusalem.
īhīcō—inhibicio.
iħł—Israhel.
iħs—Iesus.
ih'u—Iesu.
I·I·—in iure.
I·I·C·—in iure cessit.
îicio—inicio.
iiijs—quatuor semis (4 ½)
IIIO—tertio.
IIIX—13.
II°—duo.
I·I·R·—in integrum restitutio.
ĪJ—2000.
I·L·—intra limitem or ius liberorum.
I·L·D·—in loco divino.
iłł—illis.
ill'imis—illegitimis.
illuīa—illumina.
I·L·P·—in loco publico.
i·l°·r·—in loco religioso.
i·l°·s·—in loco sacro.
IM'—Imperator.
·íḿ·—in mense.
Iḿp.C.etd.ss.—Imperatore, Consule et die suprascriptis.
inđ—Indictione.
indī°—individuo.
inđn—Indictione.
ind'ra—indifferentia.
infl'o—inflammatio.
Inħlp—inlustris Patricii or Præfecti or Præfecturæ.
in·in·—in integrum.
ĩnocñe—innocentiæ.
inpña—inpœnitentia.
intl'ˡ'—intellectualis.
int'pol'o—interpolatio.
inʒ—inest.
io·—Ioannis (Evangelium).
I°—uno.
IØ—10.
IØI—101.
Ioħ—Iohanne.
i°°—illo modo.
I'oʒ—ideoque.
I·P·—in platea, in provincia, in publico.
IP—ius prætorium.
ip'—ipsius.
ĩpl'oe—impulsione.
īp9ˡ—impossibilis.
i·q·—ius Quiritum.
irl'm—Ierusalem.
I·S·—iudicatum solvi or iudicium solvit.
i·sł·—Israel.
istd'—istud.
istis—iamscriptis.
istō—infrascripto.
īst'o—institutio.
I·T·—intra tempus.
I·T·C·—infra tempus constitutum.
îtēcoēʒ—intencionem.
ītll'ia—intelligentia.
ītll'r—intelligitur.
ītll'x—intellexit.
iū—iure.
iudō—iudicio.
iud·p·—iudicium potest.
iuʳata—iurata.
·ī·xl—1040.
i÷—id est.
ī÷—inest.

J 
j—1.
J or ·J·—2, Iacobus, id est, Iesus.
Ja de ra—Jacobus de Ravanis.
Je.—Jeremiæ.
Je'o9—Jeronymus.
Jhū—Jesu.
Jo.f.—Jonnes Faventius.
Joħe or J°h'e—Johanne.
Joħs—Johannes.
JØ—10.
Jurd°—Jurisdictio.

K 
K—Kalumnia, Kapitulum, Capitulum, Kaput.
K. or Ka. or Kar.—Karolus (de Tocco).
·K·—Kapitulo.
KA'—Karolus.
K·B·—karitas bona.
kāl—kalendas.
kałđrm—kalendarum.
kałn—kalendas.
kārtła—kartula.
kk—kalumniæ kausa.
KK.—Karissimus (or -mi).
kld·—kalendas.
Klrū—Kalendarum.
kłs—kalendas or Karolus.
KO—hemina.
KR·—karitas.
Kŕ—kalendarum.
KR·P·—karitas pura.
KRT—karitas tua.
Ky—Cyathus.

L 
 l·—laudabilis.
l;—licet.
 ł—laicus, laica, licet or vel.
L'—Ludovicus.
Ł—Lectio.
La.—Lanfrancus (de Crema) or Laurentius.
Lắ—laudam.
Laf. or Lan.—Lanfrancus (de Crema).
Łatḡ—Lantgravius.
lb·—liberi.
l·b·p·—locus bene possessus.
l·c·—libertatis causa.
ld·—laudandum.
l·dd·—locus dedicatus.
lg·—legavit or legem.
LIA—quinquagesima prima.
l'ima—legitima.
li°—libro.
liū—liviensis.
ll·—laudabiles loci.
L·M·D·—locus mortui deditus.
L·M·P·—locus male possessus.
ł'o—locutio.
łoc—locatione.
Lot.—Lotarius.
lo°—loco.
l·pl·—locus publicus.
l'r—legitur.
lu.—Lucæ (Evangelium)
lʒ—licet.

M 
M—Mulier.
ḿ—manus or mense.
ḿ.—milliaria.
MAGD—Magistratus dixit.
mala.—Malachiæ (Prophetia).
Matħs—Matthæus.
maʒ—manet.
M·C·U·—manu conservatum vocavit.
M·D—manu divina.
M·D·O·—mihi dare oportet.
m'e—mere.
med'—medicus, medietas, medietatis.
međte—medietate.
mełł—melliorandum.
m'emʳ—meremur.
m'eʳ—meretur.
MF·—manifestum.
MF·F·—manifestum fecit.
mgʳ—magister.
mħ—mihi.
m'i—miseri.
mīaʒ—misericordiam.
Mich'is—Michaelis.
m'íís—matrimoniis.
mił—miles.
Miłł or Miłło or Miłłs or Mil°—Millesimo.
m'io—matrimonio.
mł—mille or milliaria.
ml'a—multa.
ml'cʒ—mulcet.
młe—male.
ml'iciˢ—melancholicis.
ml'r or młr—mulier.
ml't'—multum.
ml'ta—multa.
MM.—Magistri, Martyres, Matrimonium, Meritissimus.
mo—modii.
ḿo—monacus.
mođ—modis.
mod'—modia.
moða—Modœcia.
moˡ'—mobilis.
molð—molendinum.
monũ—monasterium.
moʳ—movetur.
ḿorú—modorum.
mōt—monte.
m°ū—modum.
moʒ—movet.
M.Pas.—M. Pascipoverus.
M·P·D·—maiorem partem diei.
m'r—meridie.
Mʳ—Magister.
mʳ—mater, materialiter, multipliciter.
m'ríce'—matricem.
mŕs—martyris.
ms or ḿs—mense or meus.
mˢ—mandamus, melius, mensis.
mscđa—misericordia.

N 
N—enim, nesciens, noster, Novellæ, numero.
.N. or ·n·—enim.
N·—Notitia.
N'—Nicolaus.
ñ—nostri.
Ñ—Nomine.
N'—nec.
narr'o—narratio.
narrʳ—narratur.
nās—nostras.
Natł—Natalem.
naucłs—nauclearius.
naʒ—nam.
nãʒ—naturam.
nāʒ—namque.
NB—nobis.
N·C—non certe.
nc—nunc.
ne—nomine.
ned'—nedum.
neḡ.ḡ.—negotiorum gestione.
NḠA—negotia.
nĩ—nostri.
nicħ—nichil.
niħ—nihil.
NĪS—Nostris.
nl—non licet, non liquet, non longe.
nłła—nulla.
nll'i—nulli.
nllo°—nullo modo.
nłłs—nullus.
nˡ°—nihilo.
n'm—numerum.
nn—nomen.
nⁿ—nomen or non.
nõ—nomen.
NO'—Nobilis.
n°—nostro, nullo, numero.
nōi—nomini.
nol't—nolunt.
noḿ—nomine.
no°ʳ—nobilior.
NŌP7—non oportet.
NŌRI—nostri.
NŌS—noster.
Notās—Notarius.
N·P·—nobili puero, non patet, non potest.
n'quā—nunquam.
nʳale—naturale.
nʳe—naturæ.
nʳm—numerum.
nro—nostro.
nʳs—numerus.
N·S·E·—non sic est.
N·U·—non vacat or non valet.
ńú—nostro viro.
nuī—numeri.
nułł—(a) nulla ora.
nũr—numerus.
nuʳʒ—numerum.
NΓ—semiuncia.

O 
Ō—non.
õ—oportet or oportuit.
Ø—0.
ôâ—omnia.
O·A·Q·—omnis ad quos.
ob'e—obest.
ob'i—obiecti.
obl'oʒ—oblationem.
O·BN·—omnia bona.
ob'o—obiecto.
obs—obstat.
O·C·—ore concilio.
occl'ta—occulta.
ocl'i—oculi.
od'—odoris.
odǐˡ'—odibilis.
O·D·M·—operæ donum munus.
odo'ʒ—odorem.
O·E·R·—ob eam rem.
o'es—omnes.
offō—officio.
O.F.M.—Ordo Fratrum Minorum.
OI—10.
ōim°—omnimodo.
oł—oleum.
ol'm—oleum.
O·MQ—Optimo Maximoque.
oḿs—omnes.
ØØ—100.
oō—omnino.
O.P. or S.O.P.—Ordo Praedicatorum, Sacri Ordinis Praedicatorum.
opil'o—opilatio.
opʒ—oportet.
oʳ or o~—obiicitur or ostenditur.
orð.—ordinatur.
ordi°—ordinatio.
orⁿ°—organo.
ós or oˢ—omnes.
O.S.B.—Ordo sancti Benedicti.
Ot.—Otto (Papiensis).
O·U·—Optimus Vir or Optimo Viro.
o·u·d—omni virtuti deditus.
oʒtuit—oportuit.

P 
p—pupilla.
p'—post.
P·A—Perpetuus Augustus.
pāc—Paciliano.
paˡ'—passibilis.
pałł. or pałłio or pałło—pallatio.
pal.sco—palatinus scholaris.
Pałt—Palatinus.
pa°—passio.
Pas.—Pascipoverus.
pat°no—patrocinio.
pbʒ—probus.
p·c·—patres conscripti.
pc—post consulatum.
pč—Principatus.
P·D·E·—Possessio data est.
pẽa—pœna.
pēn—pensione.
pês—penes.
Pħ—Philippus.
pħa—philosophia.
pħe—philosophiæ.
ph's—Philippus or philosophus.
piḡ—pignori.
piss.—piissimo.
pl—placuit.
pl'a—plura.
płac—placuerit.
pl'es—plures.
pl'ibʒ—pluribus.
pl'ie—plurimæ.
pl'im—plurimum.
pl'mo or pl'o—pulmo.
pl'mʒ or pl'mqʒ—plerumque.
pl'ra or płra—plaustra or plura.
plt—placitum.
pl'timi—penultimi.
pl'ủi—pulveri.
plʒ—placet.
ṕ.m—propria manu.
pnãm—pœnitentiam.
pnīe—pœnitentiæ.
pōitīe—positive.
põr—portinarii.
por°—portio.
p.os.b.—(post) pedum oscula beatorum.
postr.—postridie.
post~—possunt.
pot; or pot'—potest.
pōt—potestas or potuit.
pp—perpetuus or perpetuum.
PP.—Papa, Patres, Piissimus.
ṕṕ—pater patriae.
ppaug—Perpetuus Augustus.
ṕṕd—praesens praesentibus dixi.
ppl—perpetualis.
ppl'o—populo.
ppł'ris—popularis.
P·P·N·—pater patriæ nominatus.
pr—praetor.
PR—Popolus Romanus.
ṕr—presbyter.
pʳa—pura.
prm.—primicerius.
pʳo—puro.
P·S·—Provincia Siciliæ.
PS. or Pˢ or P's.—Psalmus.
p's—presbyteri.
pū—pura or puta.
psbó—presbytero.
Py. or Pí.—Pillius.

Q 
q—qui or 5.
·q·—quasi.
q,—...que.
q: or Q:—...que or qui.
q:.—quæ.
Q.—Quintus.
Q'.—quod.
q:d—quid.
q; or Q;—quæ, quæque, ...que, qui, quia, quibus.
q·—...que.
qʒ—...que.
q·a·—qui appellatur.
qaghd—quo agitur habendas.
QĀM—quemadmodum.
.qʃbs—quibus.
q,cc—quia
Q·d·—quasi dicat or quasi diceret.
qʃd—quid.
qð or qd'—quod.
qđa—quondam.
qđē—quod est.
q'esc'e—quiescere.
QI—qui.
Ql—Quinquenalis.
qiđ or qið—quid or quidem.
qˡ'—qualis.
q·m·—quominus.
Q·M·P·—qui me presente.
qń—qui nominatur.
qⁿ—quando.
Q·N·P·—Quæ nobis præsentibus.
q'nʒ—quandoque.
q°—quo.
q°mg—quo magis.
q°°—quomodo.
q°q°—quoquo.
q°s—quos.
q°t·—quo tempore.
q°tlʒ—quotlibet.
q·p·—qui ponitur.
qq—quoque.
qq.ss.—qui supra.
q.q.t.t.—qua quemque tangit.
qʳ—quæritur or quartarii.
qs or q.s.—quasi, qui supra.
q:′so—quæso.
QTQ·—quotienscumque.
qũ—quamvis.
qualʒ—qualibet.
quēlʒ—quemlibet.
qu'e't—quæreret.
quł—qualiter.
QŪM—quoniam.
qúo—quoniam.
qūo—quoniam.
quoŕ—quorum.
quoʒ—quoque.
Qz—quia.

R 
r'ā—regula.
ra°—ratio.
ratā—ratam.
raū.—Ravennatis.
R·C·—Romana civitas or Romani cives.
reddʳ—redditur.
Redd~—Redditus.
rel.—relictus, relicta, ecc.
rel.q.—relicta quondam.
remoʒ—removet.
repło—repletio.
repʳ—reperitur.
reʳ—requiritur.
ret'i—recenti.
ret'no—retentio.
ret°—retroacto.
retʒ—retinet.
R.F.—Rex Francorum.
RG·—Rogatarius.
rł—reliqua.
rl'a—regula.
rl'aʒ—regulam.
rl'ibʒ—regularibus.
rl'm or rłm—regularium or relativum.
rl'ois—relationis.
R·N·—Rerum Novarum.
Rńs—Renuntians.
Ro.—rogatus or Romanos (Epistola ad).
r°—ratio, recto, regio, responsio.
Ro: cu:—Romana curia.
r'oē—ratione.
r°ˡ'—rationalis.
RP—Respublica.
R.P.D.—Reverendissimus Pater Dominus or Reverendissimo Patre Domino.
·R·P·M—Reipublicæ Mediolanensis.
RR.—Reverendissimi.
ru—rubram.

S 
S.—Salutem or sanctus.
s;—sed.
ś—sicut.
Sac.—Sacerdos or Sacerdote.
Sac°—Sacramento.
sa'gi's or saḡs—sanguinis.
sa'i—sani.
S.A.I.—Sua Altezza Imperiale.
Sał·—Salmo.
sal°ʳ—salvator.
Satʳ9—Saturnus.
sb'al'—substantialis.
sb'am—substantiam.
sbb'o—sabbato.
sb'm—subiectum or substantivum.
SĈA—Sancta.
scīfic°—sanctificatio.
scił or scilʒ—scilicet.
scirʒ—sciret.
scỉs or scīs—sanctis.
SC·L·—sacræ largitiones.
scł—scilicet.
scła—sæcula.
scłarj—sæculari.
scłm—sæculum.
scło—sæculo.
S.C.M.—Sacra Cæsarea Majestas.
scrín—scriniarius.
SĈS or Sćs—Sanctus.
SCÚS—Sanctus.
SCV'—scutiferi.
scʒ—scilicet.
S·D·—sententiam dixit or sub die.
seð—sedis or sedit.
sel'—semel.
senˡ'—sensibilis.
sepˡ'—septentrionalis.
seq~.—sequitur.
sest.—sestarii.
se9—secum.
S&—Sed.
S·F·—sacris faciundis or satisfecit.
SFF·—sufficit.
sg°ne—significatione.
SI'—Sigillum.
siḡ—signum.
sigłłm—sigillum.
siḡo—significatio.
sił—siliginis or simul.
siłia—similia.
sil'i°—simili modo.
sill's or sill'ʒ—sillogismus.
siˡ°—simbolo.
sim'l—simul.
simʳ or sīpʳ—simpliciter.
sipˣ—simplex.
sł—similiter.
słds—solidis.
słr—similiter.
słt—salutem or scilicet.
$ math'—Secundum Matheum.
S.M.E.—Sancta Mater Ecclesia.
smłtr—similiter.
S.M.M.—Sancta Mater Maria.
sṅ or sn'—sine.
Sō—Solutio.
sol'—solidi or solum.
sol'oi—solutioni.
sol'om—solutionem.
solʳ—solvitur.
solˢ—solutus.
sołt—soluta.
sol&—solidos.
so°—solo or solutio.
soph.—Sophoniæ.
sp'a—sphæra.
spālja—spiritualia.
S.PE.—Sanctus Petrus.
spēm—speciem.
spiʳ—simpliciter.
spḿ—spiritum.
spʳ—simpliciter or super.
spū·ss·—spiritu sancto.
sp'uū—spirituum.
spˣ—simplex.
sŕ—a sero.
sʳ—sequitur, similiter, super.
S.R.I.—Sacrum Romanum Imperium or Sanctum Romanum Imperium.
SS. or ss— sancti or sanctissimus, simul sumpti, subscripsi, substantia, suprascripti, suprascriptus.
sˢ—sanctus or syllogismus.
ssaʳ—specialiter.
ssē—specie.
sseaʳ—specialiter.
S.S.S.—supra scripti sunt.
ssˢ—species.
S·T·—sine testibus.
STD·—satis dat.
STEP'—Stephanus.
stî—suprascripti.
stipl'o—stipulatio.
stipˢ—stipulans.
st'o—statio.
ST·TP—statuta tempora.
sú—sive.
sũũ—summum.
S.V.—Sanctitas Vestra, Sancta Virgo.
sˣ—simplex.
sylł—syllabam.
S7—Sed.
S9—Sed.

T 
T—oboli tres, superstes, tibi, 2.
T.—templum, testatur, testis, tomus, titulus.
ṫ—talis, ter, tum.
t°—tertio.
ta.—tabula.
tal'—talis.
tēbātʳ—tenebantur.
tem.—temptationis.
tēmʳ—tenemur.
tēntʳ—tenentur.
ten&—tenet.
TĒP'—Tempore.
teʳ—tenetur.
test'.—testibus.
tētʳ—tenetur.
thimo.—Thimotheum (Epistola ad).
tỉato—terminato.
Tím.—Timoteum (epistola Pauli ad).
Tít.—Titum (epistola ad).
tł—talis.
tⁿ—tamen.
t.°—tergo.
toⁿˢ—totiens.
to°—toto.
totʳ—totaliter.
tpc—tempus.
t·p·d·—tenere posidere donare.
tʳ—taliter or tripliciter.
tŕe—terræ.
ts—testis.
tˢ—tempus.
TT.—Testamentum.

U 
U—Ugo (Hugo).
ū—unde, ut, vel.
ūbū—verbum.
uC—vir Clarus.
U.C.—Urbis Conditæ.
úć—vir clarissimus or vir consularis.
úćdef—vir clarissimus defensor.
úćrog—vir clarissimus rogatarius.
u.d.—vir devotissimus, vir devotus, vir discretus.
ŨDC—5600.
u.d.pál.sćl—vir devotus palatina schola.
u·d·p·r·l·p·—ut de plano recte legi posset.
uelð—velud.
U.F.—Felicissimus, Fratres, Pandectae (prob. for Gr. II).
UF—usufructis or vir fortis.
Ug.—Ugo or Hugo.
Ū·Ḡ·—verbi gratia.
ú.ģl.él.ó—vir gloriosus electissimus optimus.
uħ—vir honorabilis, vir honestus.
u·ħ·fὁr—vir honestus forensis.
uidd'—videndum.
uiđł—videlicet.
uiłłi—villani.
ú·ínl·—vir inluster.
uǐs—vestris.
u.ł.—vir laudabilis.
ủllo°—nullo modo.
ułr—universaliter.
ú·m·—vir magnificus.
uoł:—voluntate.
uołit—voluerit.
u.p.—vir perfectissimus.
ur˘—videtur.
uŕi—vestri.
u·s·—venerabilis sacerdos, vir sacerdos, vir spectabilis, vir strenuus.
us—usu, -usis.
us;—usque.
usaq—usus aquarum.
usʒ°—usquequo.
ủtor—vertor.
ûû—venerabilis, vir venerabilis.
ūū—verum.
uuadiḿ—wadimonium.

V 
V.—Venerabilis, Venerandus, 5.
VĀL—Vale.
V.deCa—Willelmus de Calviano.
vđł—videlicet.
V.D.M—Verbi Dei Minister.
ve'isiłe—verisimile.
veł—velis.
Vełłeg.—Vellegiani.
Veñ—Veneris.
V.G.—Verbi gratia.
VI—Vestri Imperii.
v'i—viri.
vidñr—videntur.
vi°ne—visione.
VIX—sextodecimo or 16.
VIˣˣ—120.
VI+—6,5.
vˡʲ—universali.
vl'ia—universalia.
vlłʒ—vellet.
vⁿ—unde.
vnis—universis.
v°—quinto, uno, vero, verso.
voltis—voluntatis.
vŕ—urina.
vʳ—videtur.
V.R.P.—Vestra Reverendissima Paternitas.
vsqʒ—usque.
VVVDDD—Viri Devoti (tres).
VX—quintodecimo or 15.
vʒ—valet or videlicet.
v9—unus or versus.

W 
 W.deCa.—Wilelmus de Cabriano.
Włło—Willelmo.
Wiłłṡ—Willelmus.

X 
X—10.
Xís—undecim semis (11,5).
xłsimo—quadragesimo.
Xpī—Christi.
 xpo—Christo.
Xt°—Christo.

Y 
Ẏ,—Antigraphus.
y:—qui or ...que.
ỷdēps—ydemptitas.
Y'e—Yesaiæ
·ýħs—Yesus.
ymb'—ymber.
ym°—ymago.
ȳpni—ympni.
·ypo·—Ypocrates.
Yr.—Yrnerius.
Ẏsa—Ysaias.

Z 
z—et or 2.
·z·—etiam.
Z—Obolus dimidius.
Zāb'—Zambarella.
 Ze—Zestarius (Sextarius).
 Zo—acetabulum.

Conventional signs 
₳—Asteriscus.
ɔ—Antisigma.
 ð—Asteriscus.
ʉ—enim.
*–—Asteriscus cum obelo.
&—et.
&ccłæ—ecclesiæ.
&đ.—et dimidia.
÷—dimidium, est, id est, hoc est, Limniscus.
> or ·>·—2.
>>—22.
>Λ—27.
·>Ø·—20.
ɤ—esse.
Λ—et or 7.
Λ°nał—septentrionalis.
Π—12.
ω—mulier or secundum naturam.
 ɵ—obiit or obitus.
·ẽ·—Sanctus.
 –—obolus.
 =—oboli duo.
=m9—essemus.
≈—esse.
≈s—esses.
2—et.
2°°—secundo modo.
2ʳ—dupliciter.
ʒ—3 or est.
ʒ°°—tertio modo.
6ił—siliginis or simul.
6iˣ—simplex.
6ʳd9—surdus.
7—et or 2.
7,—et cætera.
7enĩ—etenim.
7rł—et reliqua.
·8·—8.
9—compilatio, con..., cum..., 9.
9.—completorium or consecratione.
9ce°—concedo.
9cił—concilium.
9cło—conclusio.
9cluʳ—concluditur.
9dam—cuiusdam.
9d'oʒ—conditionem.
9f—confirmat.
9fẻns—conferens.
9fr—confrater.
9fʳ—confertur or confirmatur.
9g°—cognitio.
9gʳ—cognoscitur.
9îs—communis.
9mo°—commodo.
9°—conclusio or coniunctio.
·9°·—complexio.
9°m—conclusionem.
9°ne—conclusione or constructione.
9°ʳ—commentator.
9pełłr—compellitur.
9pl'—completorium.
9pl'e—complere.
9pl'o—complexio.
9pˣo or 9pˣio—complexo.
9pˣū—complexum.
9ʳ—communiter, componitur, conceditur.
9ˢ—consequens.
9siʳ—consideratur.
9ss—consulibus.
9st'o—constitutio.
9stʒ—constet.
9t~—continetur.
9tʒ or 9tiʒ—continet.
9ˣo or 9ˣ°—complexo.

Sources 
Cappelli, Adriano (2011) [1899]. Geymonat, Mario; Troncarelli, Fabio (eds.). Lexicon Abbreviaturarum: dizionario di abbreviature Latine ed Italiane usate nelle carte e codici specialmente del Medio-Evo (7th ed.). Milan: Ulrico Hoepli. .

Medieval
Medieval abbreviations
Abbreviations, medieval
Abbreviations